Alan Charlton may refer to:
 Alan Charlton (diplomat)
 Alan Charlton (artist)